Lophomma is a genus of dwarf spiders that was first described by Anton Menge in 1868.  it contains only three species, found in Canada, Russia, and the United States: L. depressum, L. punctatum, and L. vaccinii.

See also
 List of Linyphiidae species (I–P)

References

Araneomorphae genera
Linyphiidae
Palearctic spiders
Spiders of North America
Spiders of Russia